Ense is a municipality in the district of Soest, in North Rhine-Westphalia, Germany.

Geography
Ense is situated on the river Möhne, approx. 12 km north-west of Arnsberg and 12 km south-west of Soest. Ense lies at the northside of the Sauerland and at the south side of the Haarstrang.

Neighbouring municipalities
 Arnsberg
 Möhnesee
 Soest
 Werl
 Wickede

Division of the town 
Ense consists of the following 15 districts:
 Bilme (47 inhabitants)
 Bittingen (99 inhabitants)
 Bremen (Ense) (3.135 inhabitants)
 Gerlingen (66 inhabitants)
 Höingen (1.964 inhabitants)
 Hünningen (523 inhabitants)
 Lüttringen (990 inhabitants)
 Niederense (3.366 inhabitants)
 Oberense (276 inhabitants)
 Parsit (933 inhabitants)
 Ruhne (325 inhabitants)
 Sieveringen (352 inhabitants)
 Vierhausen
 Volbringen (137 inhabitants)
 Waltringen (671 inhabitants)

Twin towns
  Éleu-dit-Leauwette (France) -- since 1989
  Burkardroth (Germany)

References

External links
  

Soest (district)